Tillandsia paleacea is a species in the genus Tillandsia. This species is found from Colombia to Chile in arid biomes.

Cultivars 
 Tillandsia 'Sweet Isabel'

References 

BSI Cultivar Registry Retrieved 11 October 2009

paleacea
Flora of Bolivia